Sergey Alexandrovich Kirdyapkin (born 18 June 1980, in Insar, Mordovia) is a Russian race walker.  He was stripped of the 2012 Olympic gold medal in the 50K walk, by decision of the Court of Arbitration published 24 March 2016, due to doping violations. Due to these doping violations, he was given a three-year-and-two-month ban from athletic competition, backdated to 15 October 2012, allowing him time to still qualify for the 2016 Summer Olympics. However, Russia did not compete in athletics at the 2016 Olympics, due to the suspension of the governing body, the IAAF, due to widespread doping.

Biography
Kirdyapkin won the gold medal in the 50 km walk at the 2012 London Olympics with an Olympic record time 3:35:59.

He also won two gold medals in the 50 km walk at the 2005 World Championships in a personal best time of 3:38:08 hours and at the 2009 World Championships, finishing in 3:38:35, his second fastest ever time.

He is married to fellow racewalker Anisya Kirdyapkina. He is coached by Viktor Chegin, who also coaches racewalk world champions Valeriy Borchin and Olga Kaniskina.

Disqualification
Kirdyapkin's coach, Viktor Chegin, has been embroiled in doping controversy during his whole career and this has passed much suspicion onto Kirdyapkin. Chegin has coached no less than 30 athletes that have failed doping tests. On 20 January 2015 Kirdyapkin was disqualified for 3 years and 2 months starting from 15 October 2012, and all his results between 20 July 2009 and 20 September 2009, between 29 June 2010 and 29 August 2011, as well as between 17 December 2011 and 11 June 2012 (which include a world championship gold) were annulled.

On March 25, 2015, the IAAF filed an appeal with the Court of Arbitration in Lausanne, Switzerland, suggesting inappropriate selective disqualification periods were attributed by RUSADA, which alludes to but is not specified in the public announcement, the strange gap between Kirdyapkin's suspension dates allowing him to keep his Olympic Gold Medal.  As of April 16, the IAAF have not changed the results of the World Cup victory, which would fall under the existing RUSADA suspension period.

Achievements

Following the decision of the Court of Arbitration for Sport, published 24 March 2016, IAAF have indicated that in addition to immediately stripping Kirdyapkin of results under their control, they have also instructed the IOC to strip him of his result in the Olympic Games. As such Jared Tallent becomes the 2012 Olympic champion.

References

External links

1980 births
Living people
People from Insar
Sportspeople from Mordovia
Russian male racewalkers
Olympic athletes of Russia
Mordovian State University alumni
Athletes (track and field) at the 2008 Summer Olympics
Athletes (track and field) at the 2012 Summer Olympics
Doping cases in athletics
Russian sportspeople in doping cases
World Athletics Championships medalists
Athletes stripped of World Athletics Championships medals
World Athletics Race Walking Team Championships winners
World Athletics Championships winners